Archips kellerianus is a species of moth of the family Tortricidae. It is found in Yunnan and Sichuan, China.

The length of the forewings is 8–10 mm for males and 10–12 mm for females. The forewings are reddish brown with stripes of silver scales. The hindwings are greyish brown, but greyish white at the costal area and light yellow at the apex.

References

Moths described in 1987
Archips
Moths of Asia